Betty Price (born August 15, 1952) is an American politician and physician. A member of the Republican Party, she previously served in the Georgia House of Representatives as the member for the 48th district.  She lost her seat to Democrat Mary Robichaux on November 6, 2018.

Price was elected to the city council for Roswell, Georgia, to finish an unexpired term in 2009. She successfully ran for reelection in 2011. When State Representative Harry Geisinger died in office in 2015, Price ran in a special election to succeed him. She won the election, held on July 14, 2015.

Price graduated from Cocoa Beach High School in Cocoa Beach, Florida then earned her Bachelor of Arts from Pomona College and her Doctor of Medicine from McGill University She worked as an anesthesiologist. Her husband is former Secretary of Health and Human Services and U.S. Representative Tom Price.

In October 2017, Price was strongly criticized for "suggesting that people with HIV might be quarantined to curb the spread of the infectious disease."

References

1952 births
Living people
Republican Party members of the Georgia House of Representatives
Georgia (U.S. state) city council members
American anesthesiologists
McGill University Faculty of Medicine alumni
Pomona College alumni
People from Roswell, Georgia
People from Cocoa Beach, Florida
Women state legislators in Georgia (U.S. state)
Women city councillors in Georgia (U.S. state)
21st-century American politicians
21st-century American women politicians
20th-century American women physicians
20th-century American physicians
Women anesthesiologists
21st-century American women physicians
21st-century American physicians